British NVC community OV15 (Anagallis arvensis - Veronica persica community) is one of the open habitat communities in the British National Vegetation Classification system. It is one of two arable weed communities of light lime-rich soils.

It is a widely distributed community in south-east England, but is found only locally, its distribution being restricted to areas of suitable soils.

There are four subcommunities.

Community composition

The following constant species are found in this community:
 Scarlet pimpernel (Anagallis arvensis)
 Black-bindweed (Fallopia convolvulus)
 Knotgrass (Polygonum aviculare)
 Common field-speedwell (Veronica persica)

Two rare species are associated with the community:
 Ground-pine (Ajuga chamaepitys)
 Shepherd's-needle (Scandix pecten-veneris)

A distinctive feature of most occurrences of this community is the presence, in mid- to late-summer, of Kickxia, represented by one or both of K. spuria and K. elatine, and Euphorbia exigua.

Distribution

This community occurs widely across south-east England, but, being dependent on lime-rich soils, it occurs only locally, typically as a weed community of cereal crops.

It is essentially the same as the Kickxietum spuriae assemblage described by Kruseman and Vlieger.

Subcommunities

There are three subcommunities:
 the Stellaria media - Convolvulus arvensis subcommunity
 the ''Legousia hybrida - Chaenorhinum minus subcommunity the Agrostis stolonifera - Phascum cuspidatum'' subcommunity

References

OV15